Ahuva Spieler (born 1973, Moldova)  is an Israeli diplomat who is the Consul General in Hong Kong SAR and Macao SAR from August 2017.  Spieler is the first female consul to represent Israel in Hong Kong, replacing Sagi Karni.

Spieler earned B. A. in Far Eastern Studies (China) and International Relations, at the Hebrew University, Jerusalem, in 1997.

References

Israeli consuls
Hebrew University of Jerusalem alumni
1973 births
Living people
Israeli women diplomats